Edward Bridge Danson III (born December 29, 1947) is an American actor. He achieved stardom playing the lead character Sam Malone on the NBC sitcom Cheers, for which he received two Primetime Emmy Awards and two Golden Globe Awards. He was nominated for more Emmy Awards for roles in the legal drama Damages (2007-2010) and the NBC dramedy The Good Place (2016-2020). He was awarded a star on Hollywood's Walk of Fame.

Danson made his film debut in 1978 in the crime drama The Onion Field. His breakout role was as Jack Holden in the films Three Men and a Baby (1987) and Three Men and a Little Lady (1990). His other film roles include Body Heat (1981), Dad (1989), and Saving Private Ryan (1998).

Danson's other leading roles on television include the CBS sitcom Becker, CBS drama CSI: Crime Scene Investigation (2011-2015), and CSI: Cyber (2015-2016). In 2015, he starred in the second season of FX's anthology series Fargo. He has had comedic roles in the HBO project Bored to Death (2009-2011) and Curb Your Enthusiasm on HBO (2000–present), and the NBC sitcom Mr. Mayor (2021-2022).

Danson is also known for his longtime activism in ocean conservation. In March 2011, he published his first book, Oceana: Our Endangered Oceans and What We Can Do to Save Them which was written with journalist Michael D'Orso. He has been married to actress Mary Steenburgen since 1995.

Early life and education 
Danson was born in San Diego to Edward "Ned" Bridge Danson, Jr., (1916–2000), an archaeologist and director of the Museum of Northern Arizona from 1959 to 1975, and Jessica Harriet, née MacMaster (1916-2006). He has an older sister, Jessica Ann ("Jan") Haury. Ted Danson was raised in Flagstaff, Arizona. His ancestry is mostly English; his family is also part Scottish. Their ancestors lived in colonial New England and are descended from Roger Williams, Anne Hutchinson, John Webster, and Roger Ludlow.

In 1961, Danson enrolled in the Kent School, a university-preparatory school in Connecticut; he was a star player on the basketball team. He became interested in drama while attending Stanford University; in search of a better acting program he transferred to Carnegie Mellon University in Pittsburgh. He received a bachelor of fine arts in drama in 1972.

Career

Television

Early career 
Danson began his television career as a contract player on the daytime soap opera Somerset. He played the role of Tom Conway from 1975 to 1976. In 1977, he played Dr. Mitchell Pierson on the daytime soap opera The Doctors, having also appeared earlier in 1975 as another character, Dr. Chuck Weldon. He was also in a number of commercials, most notably as the "Aramis man".

His guest appearances on television in the late 1970s and early 1980s include being on Laverne & Shirley, B. J. and the Bear, Family, Benson, Taxi, Magnum, P.I., The Amazing Spider-Man, Tucker's Witch, and Mrs. Columbo.

Career breakthrough: Cheers 

In 1982, Danson was cast as a former local legend baseball player and bartender Sam Malone on the NBC sitcom Cheers. On the show he has an on-and-off relationship with the college-educated, sophisticated Diane Chambers. Although the show finished last in the ratings in the first season, it was well received by critics. Ratings gradually improved in 1983, and by 1986 Cheers was one of the top-10 shows on TV. The show ran for 11 seasons and its finale (May 20, 1993) was watched by 80 million people, becoming the second-most watched finale in television history at that time. It won four Emmy Awards for Outstanding Comedy Series and a Golden Globe for Best Series–Musical or Comedy. The show ran from 1982 to 1993; Danson received 11 consecutive Emmy nominations and 9 Golden Globe nominations winning two Emmys and two Golden Globes. In 2002, TV Guide named Cheers the 18th Greatest Show of All Time. It was included in Time's 100 Greatest Shows of All Time.

Danson also appeared as Sam Malone in guest-starring roles on other sitcoms, such as Cheers spin-off Frasier, The Jim Henson Hour, and The Simpsons.

Later career 
Although he was best known for his work in comedy, he also appeared in a drama, Something About Amelia, about a family devastated by the repercussions of incest, which co-starred his later co-star on Damages, Glenn Close. He won a Golden Globe Award for Best Actor in a Miniseries or Television Movie and was nominated for an Emmy Award. In 1996, three years after Cheers concluded, Danson starred in the short-lived CBS sitcom Ink with his real-life wife Mary Steenburgen. In the same year, they starred as Lemuel Gulliver and his wife in an acclaimed television miniseries of Gulliver's Travels.

Danson went on to star in the successful CBS sitcom Becker (produced by Paramount Television which also produced Cheers), which ran from 1998 to 2004. Danson also plays a fictionalized version of himself on Curb Your Enthusiasm. He reprised the role of Sam Malone in a second-season episode of Frasier and did the voice over for his character in The Simpsons episode "Fear of Flying".

In 1999, Danson was presented with a star on Hollywood's Walk of Fame.

Danson returned to series television in the fall of 2006, playing a psychiatrist in the ABC sitcom Help Me Help You, which was cancelled at midseason due to low ratings.

In 2006, Danson received a nomination for a Screen Actors Guild Award for Outstanding Performance by a Male Actor in a TV Movie or Miniseries for his role in Knights of the South Bronx.

In 2007, Danson starred in the FX Network drama Damages as a corrupt billionaire, Arthur Frobisher. The role earned him an Emmy nomination for Outstanding Supporting Actor in a Drama Series, but he lost to co-star Željko Ivanek. During the second season Danson became a recurring character instead of one of the principal cast. He received an Emmy nomination for Outstanding Guest Actor in a Drama Series but lost to Michael J. Fox for Fox's guest appearance in Rescue Me. In 2011, Danson appeared in the music video for "Make Some Noise" by the Beastie Boys. He is also mentioned in the song's lyrics.

Danson starred in the HBO sitcom Bored to Death as George Christopher, the laconic and sometime downright infantile editor of Edition magazine. Critics often praised Danson as being the highlight of the program, calling his character a "scene stealer".

In July 2011, CBS announced that Danson would star in its police drama CSI: Crime Scene Investigation. He played D.B. Russell, a new graveyard-shift supervisor who previously headed a crime lab in Seattle. Tony Shalhoub, Robin Williams, and John Lithgow were also considered for the role.

In March 2013, it was announced that Danson signed a deal to be on CSI for two more years. It was planned for the character he played to move to the third CSI spin-off, CSI: Cyber in the show's second season. CSI:Cyber was cancelled after two seasons.

In 2015, Danson appeared in the second season of the TV show Fargo. He portrays Sheriff Hank Larsson. From September 2016 to January 2020 Danson appeared opposite Kristen Bell as the character Michael in the NBC sitcom The Good Place. He has both been nominated for and won numerous awards for his performance as Michael.

In July 2019, Danson was cast as one of the main lead roles for the situation comedy Mr. Mayor, in which he plays a wealthy businessman who runs for mayor of Los Angeles for all the wrong reasons. NBC added the show to the 2020–2021 television season.

Film 
Danson has also been featured in numerous films. His most notable film appearances included Three Men and a Baby with Tom Selleck and Steve Guttenberg, its sequel Three Men and a Little Lady, and Cousins with Isabella Rossellini. He also appeared in The Onion Field (his first film, as the bagpipe-playing Officer Ian Campbell), Creepshow, Body Heat, Little Treasure, Just Between Friends (with Mary Tyler Moore), A Fine Mess, Dad, Made in America, Getting Even with Dad, Loch Ness, and Saving Private Ryan.

Personal life 

Danson and his first wife, actress Randall "Randy" Gosch (known as Randy Danson), were married in 1970 and divorced in 1975.

Danson's second wife was producer Cassandra "Casey" Coates; they were married in 1977. On December 24, 1979, while giving birth to their first daughter, Kate, Coates suffered a stroke. Danson spent several years caring for her and helping her recuperate. They later adopted a second daughter, Alexis. His affair with actress Whoopi Goldberg contributed to their divorce in 1993. At the time it was known as one of Hollywood's costliest divorces and reportedly cost Danson $30 million.

On October 7, 1995, Danson married actress Mary Steenburgen, whom he met on the set of the movie Pontiac Moon in 1993, and became the stepfather to Steenburgen's children, Lilly and Charlie, from her previous marriage to actor Malcolm McDowell.

Danson has been on a plant-based diet multiple times, but as of 2016, he is on a pescetarian diet.

Relationship with Whoopi Goldberg 
While a guest on The Arsenio Hall Show in late 1988, he met actress Whoopi Goldberg;  he describes her as "a sexy, funny woman". They became friends and were in Help Save Planet Earth in 1990 which is about saving the environment (Danson played himself, Goldberg portrayed Mother Earth). While making Made in America in April 1992, the two became romantically involved—a pairing that was heavily featured in gossip tabloids like the National Enquirer. The couple also appeared on the Rock the Vote TV special in the same year; they were set to star in a Paramount-produced version of Neal Barrett Jr.'s Pink Vodka Blues, written by Marshall Brickman.

Danson received negative press attention October 8, 1993, after his appearance wearing blackface at a Friars Club comedy roast in honor of Goldberg, and for using many racist slurs. Later Goldberg defended the sketch, explaining that she had helped write much of the material and referred Danson to the makeup artist who painted his face as a societal critique.

Environmentalism 

Danson's interest in environmental concerns began when he was 12 years old. Bill Breed, then curator of geology at the Museum of Northern Arizona, introduced Danson and their friend Marc Gaede to a "game" he referred to as "billboarding". Armed with axes and saws, Breed, Gaede, and Danson destroyed over 500 outdoor advertising signs.

Danson's interest in environmentalism continued over the years, and he began to be concerned with the state of the world's oceans. He was a contributing founder of the American Oceans Campaigns in the 1980s; it merged with Oceana in 2001 and he is a board member. His commitment to the environment led him to host the A&E television series "Challenge of the Seas" in 1991, filming 26 one-hour episodes.

In March 2011, Danson published his first book, Oceana: Our Endangered Oceans and What We Can Do To Save Them which was written with journalist Michael D'Orso.

On October 25, 2019, Danson was arrested and charged along with actress Jane Fonda at a climate-change protest outside the United States Capitol in Washington, D.C.

Political activity 
Danson is a friend of former President Bill Clinton who attended Danson and Steenburgen's wedding. Danson has donated $85,000+ to Democratic candidates, including Al Gore, John Edwards, Barbara Boxer, Bill Clinton, Al Franken, and John Kerry. He has also donated to the Democratic Party of Arkansas and the Democratic Senatorial Campaign Committee. Danson and Steenburgen campaigned for Senator Hillary Clinton during her 2008 presidential campaign. He attended the wedding of Bill Clinton and Hillary Clinton's daughter Chelsea on July 31, 2010. He appeared with Steenburgen at the 2016 Democratic National Convention. On October 3, 2016, he attended the opening of Hillary Clinton's new campaign office in Lancaster, Pennsylvania at the old Queen Pharmacy on King Street.

Filmography

Film

Television

Awards and nominations

References

Further reading

External links 

 
 
 
 
 
 
 
 

1947 births
Living people
20th-century American male actors
21st-century American male actors
American environmentalists
American male film actors
American male television actors
American people of English descent
American people of Scottish descent
Arizona Democrats
Best Miniseries or Television Movie Actor Golden Globe winners
Best Musical or Comedy Actor Golden Globe (television) winners
California Democrats
Carnegie Mellon University College of Fine Arts alumni
HuffPost writers and columnists
Kent School alumni
Male actors from Arizona
Male actors from California
Male actors from San Diego
Outstanding Performance by a Lead Actor in a Comedy Series Primetime Emmy Award winners
People from Flagstaff, Arizona